Adam Stejskal (born 23 August 2002) is a Czech professional footballer who plays as a goalkeeper for 2. Liga club Liefering.

Club career
Stejskal made his debut for Austrian Second League side Leifering on 24 July 2020 against Juniors OÖ. He started as Liefering won 5–0.

Career statistics

Club

References

2002 births
Living people
Czech footballers
Association football goalkeepers
FC Liefering players
2. Liga (Austria) players
Czech Republic youth international footballers
Footballers from Brno
Czech expatriate footballers
Expatriate footballers in Austria
Czech expatriate sportspeople in Austria